Kahni is a village in Rohtak on Rohtak-Gohana road.

Nearby villages
Ladhot
Basantpur
Dhamar
Chamariaya
Nasirpur
Rithal Narwal
Kiloi Dopana
Singhpura Khurd
Rohtak
Garhi Bohar
Singhpura Kalan
Kiloi Khas
Kanheli
Jassia
Ghilor Khurd
Garhi Majra
Khidwali
Ghuskani
Sunaria Kalan
Ghilor Kalan
Sanghi
Rithal Phogat
Bahu Jamalpur
Sunaria Khurd
Polangi
Simli
Gaddi Kheri
Taja Majra
Katwara
Dobh
Mungan
Assan
Kansala
Kanontha
Bahu Akbarpur
Baland
Bakheta
Humayun Pur
Kabul Pur

References 

Villages in Rohtak district